John Whitehead may refer to:

In business and government
 John Meek Whitehead (1852–1924), American politician in Wisconsin
 John C. Whitehead (1922–2015), American banker and civil servant
 John Whitehead (diplomat) (1932–2013), British diplomat and businessman
 John Whitehead (public servant), secretary of the New Zealand Treasury
 John L. Whitehead, member of the Virginia House of Delegates

In sport
 John Whitehead (footballer) (fl. 1890s), English footballer
 John Whitehead (baseball) (1909–1964), American baseball player for the Chicago White Sox
 John Whitehead (American football) (1924–2002), American football coach
 John Whitehead (cricketer) (1925–2000), English cricketer

Other people
 John Whitehead (theologian), 15th-century Irish theologian
 John Whitehead (architect) (1726–1802), English architect and amateur engineer, designer of the Feitoria Inglesa
 John Whitehead (physician) (1740–1804), English physician and lay preacher; biographer of John Wesley
 John Whitehead (explorer) (1860–1899), British explorer
 J. H. C. Whitehead (1904–1960), British mathematician
 John B. Whitehead (1872–1954), American electrical engineer and a professor at Johns Hopkins University
 John L. Whitehead Jr. (1924–1992), American military and test pilot
 John Whitehead (singer) (1948–2004), American singer and one-half of the duo McFadden & Whitehead
 John M. Whitehead (soldier), American chaplain and Medal of Honor recipient
 John W. Whitehead, constitutional attorney and conservative author, founder of the Rutherford Institute in 1982

See also
 Jonathan Whitehead (born 1960), composer